The Caledonian Railway (Brechin) Ltd is a private limited company formed by a group of steam railway enthusiasts, the Brechin Railway Preservation Society, with the object of operating a railway service on the former Caledonian Railway line between Brechin and Montrose, Angus, Scotland.  This line was built by the Aberdeen Railway in the 1840s. It closed for passenger traffic during the early 1950s with final closure undertaken by British Rail in 1981.

Brechin to Bridge of Dun
The two railway stations have also been refurbished.

Although the line originally went all the way to Montrose, which is still a station on the main rail network, there are currently no immediate plans to link the Brechin line back into the main rail network, as the section at Dubton through and onto Kinnaber Junction close to Montrose itself has now been redeveloped, making it difficult for the preserved railway to be reconnected to the national network at all.

Proposed extension
This is a long-term aim which would only require the re-instatement of a short length of track.

Locomotives
As well as a number of steam and diesel locomotives, the railway also owns two DMUs:

Diesel Multiple Units 
BR Class 205 no. 1128
BR Class 205 no. 1132, Operational

References

External links

Official website
Caledonian Railway Diesel Group
Video and annotation of Bridge of Dun railway station

Heritage railways in Scotland
Transport in Angus, Scotland
Tourist attractions in Angus, Scotland
Standard gauge railways in Scotland